Eustachio Locatelli (died 1575) was a Roman Catholic prelate who served as Bishop of Reggio Emilia (1569–1575).

Biography
Locatelli was ordained a priest in the Order of Preachers.
On 15 April 1569, he was appointed during the papacy of Pope Pius V as Bishop of Reggio Emilia.
On 29 April 1569, he was consecrated bishop by Scipione Rebiba, Cardinal-Priest of Sant'Angelo in Pescheria, with Antonio Ganguzia, Bishop of Vieste, and Felice Peretti Montalto, Bishop of Sant'Agata de' Goti, serving as co-consecrators. He served as Bishop of Reggio Emilia until his death on 14 October 1575.

While bishop, he was the principal co-consecrator of: Maurice MacBrien, Bishop of Emly (1571); Vincenzo de Doncelli, Bishop of Valva e Sulmona (1571); and Pietro Cancellieri, Bishop of Lipari (1571).

References

External links and additional sources
 (for Chronology of Bishops) 
 (for Chronology of Bishops) 

16th-century Italian Roman Catholic bishops
Bishops appointed by Pope Pius V
1575 deaths
Dominican bishops